El Millioner (Arabic-المليونير) or The Millionaire is one of the Egyptian comedies released in 1950. It was directed as a black and white movie by Helmy Rafla and starred the famous Ismail Yassine,

Plot
A millionaire named Assem El Estleeny (Ismail Yassine) with all of the riches gets stuck in a murder case. So in order to flee, he finds a man who looks exactly like him, Gmeez Asal (also played by Ismail Yassine). Gmeez Asal backs up for Asseem while he gets away for a week.

Main cast
 Zeinat Sedki as Baheega
 Su’ad Makkawi as Sukkara
 Camelia as Rooh el fo’ad
 Ismail Yassine as Assem/Gmeez
 Salah Mansour as Madman
 Wedad Hamdy as Sania 
 Seraj Munir as Antar
 Estafan Rosti as Zaki Bashtekha

References
 "المليونير - ﻓﻴﻠﻢ - 1950." ElCinema.com., n.d. Web. 20 Apr. 2017. <http://www.elcinema.com/work/1008579/>.
 Ismail Yassine El Millionaire 1950 [Video file]. Retrieved from https://www.youtube.com/watch?v=YbXj6F5i5qY

External links 
 The Arab Movies Database

1950 films
Egyptian comedy films
Egyptian black-and-white films
1950 comedy films